Elardus Park (Afrikaans:  Elarduspark) is a residential suburb of the city of Pretoria, South Africa. Located to the south of Waterkloof Ridge in a leafy, established area that is home to the city's medium expensive real estate.

Education 
Elardus Park houses a primary school education to Laerskool Elarduspark serving as Afrikaans speaking school.

See also
 AFB Waterkloof, an air force base located west of Elardus Park in Centurion, Gauteng.
 Hoërskool Waterkloof, a large Afrikaans High School situated between Erasmuskloof and Elardus Park.

References

Elardus Park Community Website

Suburbs of Pretoria